Talayote is:

 a town in Chihuahua, Mexico
 a common name for the plant Cynanchum racemosum
 a common name for the plant Matelea parvifolia
 the Talaiot, megaliths on the islands of Minorca and Majorca